A Bubbler or drinking fountain is a fountain designed to provide drinking water.

 Benson Bubbler, drinking fountains mostly located in Portland, Oregon

Bubbler may also refer to:
Bubbler (video game), ZX spectrum game
Bubbler bong, water pipe used for smoking tobacco, cannabis, etc. (long and thin variant used for Crystal meth )
Bubbler Ranx, Jamaican rapper and singer
Aquarium bubbler, aquarium accessory
Bubbler cylinder, component of equipment for metal organic chemical vapor deposition
Gas bubbler, laboratory glassware